The 1933 Richmond Spiders football team was an American football team that represented the University of Richmond as a member of the Virginia Conference during the 1933 college football season. In their 20th season under head coach Frank Dobson, Richmond compiled a 5–4 record and finished as Virginia co-champion.

Schedule

References

Richmond
Richmond Spiders football seasons
Richmond Spiders football